Blaine High School is a public high school in Blaine, Minnesota as part of the Anoka-Hennepin School District 11. The school was opened in 1972, as part of the Blaine Project.

Demographics
As of the 2016-17 school year, the school had an enrollment of 2,972 students and 132.25 classroom teachers (on an FTE basis), for a student–teacher ratio of 22.47:1. There were 533 students (17.9% of enrollment) eligible for free lunch and 253 (8.5% of students) eligible for reduced-cost lunch.

Academics
Blaine High School participates in the University of Minnesota's College in the Schools program.

Athletics
Blaine High School won the Minnesota high school boys hockey class AA championship in 2000, led by future NHL players Matt Hendricks and Brandon Bochenski. The school has produced three Mr. Hockey Award winners: Current NHL players Nick Bjugstad in 2010 and Riley Tufte in 2016, as well as Bryce Brodzinski, who won the award in 2019 and was selected 196th overall in the 2019 NHL Entry Draft by the Philadelphia Flyers. The football team has appeared in the state tournament 14 times, most notably in 2008 where the team defeated heavily favored Eden Prairie, which was ranked third nationally among all high schools, en route to an appearance in the state championship game. Blaine has only won one state football championship however, which came in 1988. The Girls Nordic Skiing Team won the 1979 state championship.

The nickname for the school's athletic teams is the Bengals; colors are Navy Blue, Columbia Blue and White.

Notable alumni
 Nick Bjugstad – 2010 Mr. Hockey winner. Professional ice hockey player for the Arizona Coyotes.
 Brandon Bochenski – Former professional ice hockey player in the NHL and KHL.
 Jonny Brodzinski – Professional ice hockey player for the New York Rangers.
 Trevor Frischmon – Former professional ice hockey player in the NHL.
 Matt Hendricks – Former professional ice hockey player for 15 years in the NHL.
 Blaine Hogan – actor
 Dan Johnson – Former MLB first baseman.
 Patrick O'Bryant – Professional basketball player. Selected 9th overall in 2006 NBA Draft by the Golden State Warriors.
 Riley Tufte – 2016 Mr. Hockey winner. Professional ice hockey player for the Dallas Stars.
Isabelle Stadden – Swimmer. Earned a pair of top-5 finishes at the U.S. Olympic Trials in Omaha, 2021. Gold medalist in the women's 4x100 meter medley relay even and silver medalist in the women's 200 meter backstroke at the 2019 Pan American Games. Currently swimming for the University of California, Berkeley.

References

External links

Public high schools in Minnesota
Educational institutions established in 1972
Schools in Anoka County, Minnesota
1972 establishments in Minnesota
Blaine, Minnesota